The ninth Annual American Music Awards were held on January 25, 1982.

Winners and nominees

References
 http://www.rockonthenet.com/archive/1982/amas.htm

American Music Awards